Muhammad Rifat (sometimes spelled Rif'at or Rifaat) (May 9, 1882 – May 9, 1950) was the first Quran reciter to read on Egyptian Cairo Radio on May 31, 1934, and his voice and style, as well as his general character, have been promoted as a model of the ideal reciter.

Rifat is often praised for correlating melody to the meaning of the Qur'anic Verses, a feat known in Arabic as tasweer al-mana.

Background
Rifat completed memorisation of the Qur'an by the age of ten. He then studied the rules of recitation under Sheikh Mohammed Al-Bughdadi and Sheikh Al-Samalouti.

In addition to his work on radio, Sheikh Rifat was the official reciter of the Qur'an at Mustapha Pacha mosque in Cairo for more than 25 years until, in 1942, he contracted an illness which left him unable to continue.

On the day that Sheikh Mohammed Rifat died, announcers around the world proclaimed the loss of one of the Islamic beacons of light.

Recitation of Surat al fatehat
In addition to recordings made by the radio station, there exist a limited number of recordings made by Zakariyyâ Muhran Basha and Muhammad Khamees which his son, Mr. Hussain Rifat, has made available to the public. The recordings suffer distortion and are not regarded as a true likeness of the reciter's voice.

References
Saifulla, M S M & Muhammad Ghoniem. September 27, 2001. Biographies Of Some Professional Reciters Of The Qur'ân From Egypt Islamic Awareness. Accessed August 23, 2007.
Sheikh Mohammed Rifa¹at 'Master' of the Holy Qur¹an Reciters May 10, 2000. Accessed August 23, 2007.

Egyptian Quran reciters
Egyptian Muslims
1882 births
1950 deaths